Iceland competed at the 2020 Winter Youth Olympics in Lausanne, Switzerland from 9 to 22 January 2020.

Alpine skiing

Boys

Girls

Cross-country skiing 

Boys

Girls

See also
Iceland at the 2020 Summer Olympics

References 

Nations at the 2020 Winter Youth Olympics
Iceland at the Youth Olympics